Mellonsfolly Ranch is a wild west replica resort city in New Zealand.

The ranch is built on a 900-acre lot in the North Island’s Central Plateau, between Taumarunui and Ohakune. It includes ten period themed buildings and honey making business. 

The town was built in 2006 by cowboy enthusiast John Bedogni as a replica of an 1860s Wyoming frontier town.

Mellonsfolly Ranch was used as the set for the 2011 Good for Nothing film.

The town is owned by Rob Bartley, an aluminium car parts manufacturer. In 2020, he put the town up for sale with a price tag of $7.5 million USD.

References 

Ruapehu District